Mozaffari (also Romanized as Moz̧affarī) is a village in Pataveh Rural District, Pataveh District, Dana County, Kohgiluyeh and Boyer-Ahmad Province, Iran. At the 2006 census, its population was 75, in 15 families.

References 

Populated places in Dana County